The Chupilca del diablo (The Devil's Chupilca) is a mix of black gunpowder with aguardiente. It was prepared by Chileans during the War of the Pacific.  When consumed by a soldier, he would go berserk in battle and attack his enemies without fear or remorse.

Chupilca can also refer to a different mixture, made of chicha or wine with toasted flour.

Mixed drinks